Coggia is a commune in the Corse-du-Sud department of France on the island of Corsica.

History
On 17 January 2010, bombs went off at two residences in Coggia, the entry "sdate G. Leclair FLNC piu che mai" was found in at least one of the sites.

Population

See also
Communes of the Corse-du-Sud department
Tour de Corse.

References

Communes of Corse-du-Sud
Corse-du-Sud communes articles needing translation from French Wikipedia